Echimăuți is a village in Rezina District, Moldova.

Notable people
 Elefterie Sinicliu
 Meir Dizengoff, first mayor of Tel Aviv

References

Villages of Rezina District
Tivertsi